Sarah Ann Jones (born 20 December 1972) is a British Labour Party politician. She has been the Member of Parliament (MP) for Croydon Central since the 2017 general election. She was appointed as Shadow Minister for Housing in May 2018, and made Shadow Minister of State for Police and the Fire Service in 2020.

Life and career
Jones was born in Croydon and is a lifelong resident. She was educated at the private Old Palace School in Croydon and at Durham University, where she read History. She was a member of Trevelyan College.

Jones joined the Labour Party aged 19 in 1992 after watching Conservative Party MP Peter Lilley, then the Secretary of State at the Department of Social Security, make a speech to his party's annual conference where he attacked benefit claimants and women who allegedly become pregnant to gain council housing. Jones, who was pregnant at the time, joined the Labour Party as a direct reaction to the speech.

Before becoming an MP, Jones served as a senior civil servant and was part of the team delivering the 2012 London Olympic and Paralympic Games.  Jones worked with Tessa Jowell, who was Minister for the Olympics at the time. She remained close with Jowell, and in 2018 Jones led a debate in the House of Commons paying tribute to Jowell's fight against brain cancer and her campaign for improved cancer treatment.  Jones continued to campaign in the wake of Jowell's death, prompting the government to launch the Tessa Jowell Brain Cancer Mission (TJBCM). Upon its launch, Jones was appointed to the Joint Strategy Board of the TJBCM.

A former Head of Campaigns at the housing charity Shelter, Jones worked for Labour MP and Northern Ireland Secretary Mo Mowlam and later ran campaigns at the NHS Confederation.

Parliamentary career 
Jones was selected to contest the marginal Croydon Central constituency at the 2015 general election. Despite achieving a 5.9% swing to Labour, Jones narrowly lost by 165 votes to the incumbent Conservative MP Gavin Barwell.

At the 2017 general election, she defeated Barwell with a majority of 5,652 votes. Jones's victory made further headlines due to Barwell publishing a book titled How to Win a Marginal Seat after his 2015 victory.

Jones made her maiden speech in the House of Commons during a debate on the Grenfell Tower fire. Jones criticised politicians' failure to listen to Grenfell victims before the disaster, and called on the Government to retrofit sprinklers in all council tower blocks. The speech received widespread coverage for being the first time Croydon rapper Stormzy was quoted in Parliament, with Jones warning MPs: "You're never too big for the boot."

After highlighting the rise in knife crime in Croydon during the general election campaign, Jones has run a campaign calling for a stronger Government response to knife crime across the UK. She launched the All-Party Parliamentary Group (APPG) on Knife Crime in September 2017, being elected as the group's Chair. At its launch over 30 MPs and Peers joined the group, which is supported by charities Redthread and Barnardo's. The APPG's stated aims are to 'look in detail at the root causes of knife crime – with particular focus on prevention and early intervention'.

Jones was appointed as Parliamentary Private Secretary to John Healey, Labour's Shadow Housing Secretary in January 2018, and was subsequently promoted to Shadow Housing Minister in 2018, succeeding Tony Lloyd. She was re-elected in the December 2019 election, again for Croydon.

She backed Keir Starmer in the 2020 Labour Party leadership election.

Views
On rising rates of knife crime, Jones has said,

Personal life 
Jones is married and has four children.

References

External links 

1972 births
21st-century English women politicians
21st-century English politicians
Alumni of Trevelyan College, Durham
Female members of the Parliament of the United Kingdom for English constituencies
Labour Party (UK) MPs for English constituencies
Living people
People educated at the Old Palace School
People from Croydon
UK MPs 2017–2019
UK MPs 2019–present